Abigail Kwarteng (born January 13, 1997, in Bekwai) is a Ghanaian high jumper. She has competed at world championships, most recently at the 2019 African Games in Rabat, Morocco.

Education 
She was a student of Alabama University. and currently attends Middle Tennessee State University.

Career 
In February 2016 she performed impressively at the National Open Athletics Championship which qualified her for the 2016 Africa Athletics Championships. Kwarteng made her first international experience in 2016 at the African Championships in Athletics in Durban, where she finished fourth with 1.76 m, as well as two years later at the African Championships in Asaba with 1.80 m. In 2019 she took part for the first time in the African Games in Rabat and made a jump of 1.75 m which earned her the eight position.

Personal best

Outdoor 

 High jump: 1.87 m, 5 May 2018 in Lubbock

Indoor 

 High jump (hall): 1.82 m, February 23, 2019, in Fayetteville

References

External links 

 Abigail Kwarteng in the IAAF database 
 Rolltide.com

Living people
1997 births
Ghanaian female high jumpers
African sportspeople
Athletes (track and field) at the 2019 African Games
African Games competitors for Ghana
Alabama Crimson Tide women's track and field athletes